Aryana Lynn Harvey (born April 2, 1997) is an American professional soccer player, who plays as a midfielder for Fatih Vatan Spor in the Turkish Women's Football Super League.

Early years 
Aryana Lynn Harvey was born to Antonio Harvey and Kim Starr Harvey in Tualatin, Oregon, United States on April 2, 1997.

She started playing soccer on the school team during her high school years in her hometown between 2011 and 2015. She played for the college team of Pfeiffer University Falcons at Misenheimer, North Carolina in 2016. She scored 9 goals in 19 matches. Between 2017 and 2019, she played for the college team of CSU Bakersfield Roadrunners, where she appeared in 55 games and scored 7 goals.

Club career 

In the beginning of 2022, she moved to Turkey, and joined the new established Çaykur Rizespor to play in the second half of the 2021-22 Turkish Women's Football Super League.

In the 2022–23 Super League season, Harvey transferred to the Istanbul-based club Fatih Vatan Spor.

References 

1997 births
Living people
People from Tualatin, Oregon
Soccer players from Oregon
American women's soccer players
Women's association football midfielders
Cal State Bakersfield Roadrunners women's soccer players
California State University, Bakersfield alumni
American expatriate women's soccer players
Expatriate women's footballers in Turkey
American expatriate sportspeople in Turkey
Turkish Women's Football Super League players
Çaykur Rizespor (women's football) players
Fatih Vatan Spor players